In computing, systeminfo, is a command-line utility included in Microsoft Windows versions from Windows XP onwards and in ReactOS.

Overview
The command produces summary output of hardware/software operating environment parameters.
The detailed configuration information about the computer and its operating system includes data on the operating system configuration, security information, product ID, and hardware properties, such as RAM, disk space, and network cards.

The ReactOS version was developed by Dmitry Chapyshev and Rafal Harabien. It is licensed under the GPL.

Syntax
The command-syntax is:

 systeminfo[.exe] [/s Computer [/u Domain\User [/p Password]]] [/fo {TABLE|LIST|CSV}] [/nh]

See also
System profiler
System Information (Windows)

References

Further reading

External links

systeminfo | Microsoft Docs

Console applications
Utilities for Windows
Windows administration